"Comedians" is the first episode of the third season of Beavis and Butt-Head and the 30th episode of the series overall. This episode has received heavy controversy after a 5-year-old boy burned down his trailer home, killing his 2-year-old sister who was sleeping in the next room. It was suggested that the boy was inspired by this episode, when Beavis and Butt-Head burn down a comedy club.

Plot
Beavis and Butt-Head are sitting, watching television when they see a commercial for a documentary about a stand-up comedian (Andrew Dice Clay) who lives an affluent lifestyle from his earnings. Although Beavis would rather go to Stewart's house and burn things, Butt-Head decides that they should go to the comedy club to become "stand-up chameleons".

They arrive at the club (named The Laff Hole), and Butt-Head goes on stage first, but only Beavis finds his jokes funny and he is eventually booed off stage. Beavis is next, and the audience exits quickly, leaving only Butt-Head to watch him. Inspired by an earlier act, Beavis attempts to juggle burning newspapers, but ends up burning the club down. The pair watch the fire spread from outside while they declare how funny and cool they both are.

Controversy
On October 6, 1993 (exactly one month after the episode had aired), Austin Messner, a 5-year-old boy from Moraine, Ohio, burned down his family's trailer with a cigarette lighter, killing his 2-year-old sister. The boy's mother claimed that he had been watching the show prior to the incident, a claim refuted by neighbors who stated the family did not have cable. Regardless, this episode in particular was blamed, due to the similarities between the plot and the incident. The following week, MTV decided to move the show to 10:30 PM instead of 7:00 PM and also decided to delete any fire references in future episodes. They had to heavily edit the episode before they finally took it off the air.

In 2008, Messner himself would confirm that his family did not have cable at the time due to his mother's drug addiction, and that he had never seen an episode of the show, nor planned to.

References

External links
 

Beavis and Butt-Head episodes
1993 American television episodes
Animation controversies in television
Stand-up comedy
Television episodes pulled from general rotation
Television controversies in the United States